James Cameron Maiden (1 October 1881 – 13 January 1958) was a Scottish-American professional golfer. He was born in Carnoustie, Scotland, the son of a payroll clerk at a local foundry. He emigrated from Scotland to the United States in 1901. He won the 1906 Ohio Open and the Eastern PGA in 1909. In 1924 he won the Long Island Open, a PGA Tour event at the time.  He was a founding member of the PGA of America in 1916.

Early life
Maiden was the son of James Maiden (1841–1914) and Elspeth Maiden née McLean (1845–1928). He left Scotland in 1901 and emigrated to the United States, became a naturalized citizen, and took a job as assistant under head professional Alex Smith at Nassau Country Club in Glen Cove, New York. His brother, Stewart Maiden (1886–1948), was also a golf professional whose base was at East Lake Golf Club at the Atlanta Athletic Club. Both of the Maiden brothers are credited with helping teach the golf swing to Bobby Jones. It was Stewart Maiden's smooth, silky swing that initially caught Jones' eye, and he said he tried to emulate Stewart's swing.

Golf career

PGA of America founding member
Rodman Wanamaker, the wealthy proprietor of the Wanamaker department stores (now Macy's), and a number of golf professionals—including the legendary Walter Hagen and leading amateurs of the era—gathered at Wanamaker's invitation for a luncheon at the Taplow Club in the Martinique Hotel on Broadway and West 32nd Street in New York City on 17 January 1916.  Wanamaker believed golf professionals could enhance equipment sales if they formed an association. It was during this meeting that Maiden, Herbert Strong, James Hepburn, Jack Hobens, Jack Mackie, Gilbert Nicholls and Robert White were chosen as the organizing committee of the PGA of America. The Taplow Club gathering initiated a series of several meetings over the next several months and, on 10 April 1916, the PGA of America was officially established with 35 charter members.

Maiden and Bobby Jones
In 1923, Bobby Jones paid a visit to Nassau Country Club and at the suggestion of Maiden bought a putter from him, a club which Maiden had nicknamed "Calamity Jane". Jones, who was struggling with his putting at the time, would go on to use the putter with astounding success for the next seven years until his retirement from competitive golf in 1930 after winning the Grand Slam. The Maiden brothers are portrayed in the 2004 biographical drama film, Bobby Jones: Stroke of Genius, which is based on the life of Bobby Jones.

1906 U.S. Open
Maiden's main duties as a club professional were to give lessons and repair and build clubs for members at the courses where he worked, therefore his appearances in tournaments were minimal. His most important achievement as a player was a tie for third place in the 1906 U.S. Open. Years later—at the age of 42—he would win the 1924 Long Island Open, a PGA Tour event at the time.

Family
Maiden was married to Elizabeth MacGillivray (born 1889) and they had two children, James Cameron Maiden, Jr. (1914–2005) and Natalie Maiden Vasiliu (born 1918). Natalie was married to the noted Romanian-American author of children's books, Mircea Vasiliu (1920–2008).

Death
Maiden died on 13 January 1958 in Glen Cove, New York. Interment was in the Nassau Knolls Cemetery, Port Washington, New York.

Professional wins (3)

PGA Tour wins
1924 Long Island Open

References

External links
Wawashkamo Golf Club Scottish Links Course designed by Alex Smith on Mackinac Island, Michigan
Article on early Scottish golfers in the U.S. (including the Smith brothers)

Scottish male golfers
American male golfers
Golf administrators
Golfers from Carnoustie
Sportspeople from Angus, Scotland
Sportspeople from Glen Cove, New York
Scottish emigrants to the United States
1881 births
1958 deaths